Naustathmus or Naustathmos was a port and anchorage on the coast of ancient Cyrenaica, 100 stadia from Apollonia. 

Its site is located near Marsa Hilal, Libya. The remains which have been found there indicate an ancient site.

References

Populated places in ancient Cyrenaica
Former populated places in Libya
Ancient Greek archaeological sites in Libya
Roman sites in Libya